Jean Borotra defeated Jack Cummings 6–4, 6–1, 4–6, 5–7, 6–3 in the final to win the men's singles tennis title at the 1928 Australian Championships.

Seeds
The seeded players are listed below. Jean Borotra is the champion; others show the round in which they were eliminated.

  Jean Borotra (champion)
  Gerald Patterson (quarterfinals)
  Jacques Brugnon (third round)
  Jack Crawford (semifinals)
  Christian Boussus (third round)
  Harry Hopman (quarterfinals)
  Jack Hawkes (quarterfinals)
  Gar Moon (third round)

Draw

Key
 Q = Qualifier
 WC = Wild card
 LL = Lucky loser
 r = Retired

Finals

Earlier rounds

Section 1

Section 2

Section 3

Section 4

See also
1928 Australian Championships – Women's singles

References
 
  Source for seedings

1928
1928 in Australian tennis
Men's Singles